Executive sponsor (sometimes called project sponsor or senior responsible owner) is a role in project management, usually the senior member of the project board and often the chair. The project sponsor will be a senior executive in a corporation (often at or just below board level) who is responsible to the business for the success of the project.

Responsibilities 
The sponsor has a number of interfaces and responsibilities for the project.

Board 
The responsibilities for which the sponsor is accountable to the board are:

 Provides leadership on culture and values
 Owns the business case
 Keeps project aligned with organization's strategy and portfolio direction
 Governs project risk
 Works with other sponsors
 Focuses on realization of benefits
 Recommends opportunities to optimize cost/benefits
 Ensures continuity of sponsorship
 Provides assurance
 Provides feedback and lessons learned

Project manager 
The governance activities that take place between the sponsor and the project manager are:

 Provides timely decisions
 Clarifies decision-making framework
 Clarifies business priorities and strategy
 Communicates business issues
 Provides resources
 Engenders trust
 Manages relationships
 Supports the project manager's role
 Promotes ethical working

Project stakeholders 
In addition to these activities the following activities take place between the sponsor and other project stakeholders:

 Engages stakeholders
 Governs stakeholder communications
 Directs client relationships
 Directs governance of users
 Directs governance of suppliers
 Arbitrates between stakeholders

Impact 
Due to the problem-solving needs of the role, the executive sponsor often needs to be able to exert pressure within the organization to overcome resistance to the project.  For this reason a successful executive sponsor will ideally be a person with five personal attributes - understanding, competence, credibility, commitment and engagement.

A few research studies have been published that not only detail the role of this individual within project management but also provide a way to ensure that the success of a project is increased if this individual plays a more active role.

Senior Responsible Officer role
The UK government treats the role of a Senior Responsible Officer (SRO) as distinct from the sponsor's role, referring to projects where the sponsor "may be considered to be at a very senior level or part of a sponsoring group, above the SRO". A Public Administration Select Committee report published in 2011 and critical of UK government IT procurement, noted that SRO's had often moved on to new roles during the course of an acquisition project, and this was one of the reasons why problems had been encountered.

See also 
 Project sponsorship

References

Further reading
 Exploring the Role of the Project Sponsor, conducted by members of the Project Management Institute, in particular, Dr Lynn Crawford and Christine Brett (both at the University of Technology in Sydney, Australia).
 Top Challenges in managing Executive Sponsor Programs , based on research from the Executive Sponsor Industry Association

Project management